Captain is the name most often given in English-speaking navies to the rank corresponding to command of the largest ships. The rank is equal to the army rank of colonel and air force rank of group captain.

Equivalent ranks worldwide include ship-of-the-line captain (e.g. France, Argentina, Spain), captain of sea and war (e.g. Brazil, Portugal), captain at sea (e.g. Germany, Netherlands) and "captain of the first rank" (Russia).

Etiquette
Any naval officer who commands a ship is addressed by naval custom as "captain" while aboard in command, regardless of their actual rank, even though technically an officer of below the rank of captain is more correctly titled the commanding officer, or C.O. Officers with the rank of captain travelling aboard a vessel they do not command should be addressed by their rank and name (e.g., "Captain Smith"), but they should not be referred to as "the captain" to avoid confusion with the vessel's captain. The naval rank should not be confused with the army, air force, or marine ranks of captain, which all have the NATO code of OF-2.

US Navy traditions

On large US ships (e.g., aircraft carriers), the executive officer (XO) may hold the rank of captain; in this case, it is proper to address the XO by rank. Often the XO prefers to be called "XO" to avoid confusion with the CO, who is also a captain in rank and the captain of the ship. The same applies to senior commanders on board US aircraft carriers, where the commander and deputy commander of the embarked carrier air wing both hold the rank of captain but are addressed by the titles of "CAG" and "DCAG", respectively.

Commands
Captains with sea commands generally command ships of cruiser size or larger; the more senior the officer, the larger the ship, but ship commanders do not normally hold a higher rank than captain. In the Royal Navy, a captain might command an aircraft carrier, an amphibious assault ship, or the Ice Patrol Ship, while naval aviator and naval flight officer captains in the U.S. Navy command aircraft carriers, large-deck amphibious assault ships, carrier air wings, maritime patrol air wings, and functional and specialized air wings and air groups.

Maritime battlestaff commanders of one-star rank (commodores or rear admirals lower half) will normally embark on large capital ships such as aircraft carriers, which will function as the flagship for their strike group or battle group, but a captain will retain command of the actual ship, and assume the title of "flag captain".  Even when a senior officer who is in the ship's captain's chain of command is present, all orders are given through the captain.

By country

Belgium
Its insignia is made up of four bands. He or she commands a capital ship (cruiser, battleship or aircraft carrier) or a shore establishment.

Canada
A captain(N) is senior to a commander, and junior to a commodore.

Typical appointments for captains(N) include:
 Commanding officer of a Canadian Forces base;
 Commanding officer of a large school or research establishment, such as the Canadian Forces Maritime Warfare Centre;
 Chief of staff of a formation staff;
 Foreign military attaché.

The rank insignia for a captain(N) is four  stripes, worn on the cuffs of the service dress jacket, and on slip-ons on other uniforms. On the visor of the service cap is one row of gold oak leaves along the edge. Captains(N) wear the officers' pattern branch cap badge.

The "(N)" is a part of the rank descriptor, and is used in official publications and documents to distinguish a captain(N) from a captain in the army or air force. It is also important to distinguish between the rank of captain(N) and the appointment of captain, meaning the commanding officer of a ship, regardless of his or her rank.

Captains(N) are addressed initially as "Captain" followed by their surname (example: "Captain Bloggins"), thereafter by superiors and peers as "Captain" and by subordinates as "Sir" or "Ma'am". The "(N)" is not part of the spoken address.

Prior to the unification of the Canadian Forces in 1968, rank structure and insignia followed the British pattern.

Estonia

India

Sri Lanka

United Kingdom

United States

In the United States, the O-6 rank of captain exists in four of the uniformed services of the United States: the United States Navy, United States Coast Guard, United States Public Health Service Commissioned Corps, and National Oceanic and Atmospheric Administration Commissioned Officer Corps.

Gallery

Variants

Captain at sea
Captain at sea is a naval rank corresponding to command of a ship-of-the-line or capital ship.

Germany

Netherlands 

Gallery

Captain lieutenant

Portuguese-speaking navies

Captain of sea and war is a rank in a small number of Portuguese-speaking navies, notably those of Portugal and Brazil.

The term captain of sea and war, like the modern rank of ship-of-the-line captain in the navies of France, Italy, and Spain, has deep historic roots. Although the rank was first formally established in the 17th century, the expression had been sometimes been used in the Portuguese and Spanish (as ) armadas of the 16th century.

During the 16th century, the term  was used in Portugal to designate the second in command of a fleet. Only during the 18th century would it come to designate the fleet commander - an admiral in the more modern sense. But during the latter half of the 17th century, the term "captain of sea and war" came to designate the commander of a larger man-of-war - the ship of the line that began evolving at that time. When Brazil gained her independence from Portugal in 1822, its navy adopted the Portuguese rank denominations, which both countries still use.

Corvette captain

Frigate captain

Rank captain

Captain of the 1st, 2nd and 3rd class are ranks used by the Russian Navy and a number of former communist states. Within NATO forces, the ranks are rated as OF-5, 4 and 3, respectively.

Ship-of-the-line captain
Ship-of-the-line-captain is a rank that appears in several navies. The name of the rank derives from the fact the rank corresponded to command of a warship of the largest class, the ship-of-the-line, as opposed to smaller types (corvettes and frigates). It is normally above the rank of frigate captain.

France
 is a rank in the French Navy, corresponding to that of colonel in the French Army. They usually command the navy's most important ships.

Gallery

See also
Captain (armed forces)
Captain's cabin
Post-captain
Sea captain

Notes

References

Military ranks of Australia
Military ranks of Canada
Naval ranks
Captains